Tatsu (alternative title: Hound Dogs) is a 1994 Russian film directed by Vera Yakovenko and starring Margarita Pushkina, Nastia Poleva, Krematorij, Molotov Cocktail bands and others.

Plot
According to film director Lagunov, "Tatsu is a dragon that sits inside everyone of us. It chokes those of us who yielded to our temptations.". The film is a story of a Soviet hippy who was imprisoned for 5 years and tries to fit in after the release.

External links
 Tatsu

1994 films
1990s Russian-language films
Russian crime drama films
Russian musical drama films